Sherekino is a rural locality in Selektsionny Selsoviet Rural Settlement, Lgovsky District, Kursk Oblast, Russia. Population:

Geography 
The village is located on Lake Sherekinskoye in the Seym River basin, 48.5 km from the Russia–Ukraine border, 67 km south-west of Kursk, 1.5 km north-west of the district center – the town Lgov, 5 km from the selsoviet center – Selektsionny.

 Climate
Sherekino has a warm-summer humid continental climate (Dfb in the Köppen climate classification).

Transport 
Sherekino is located 3 km from the road of regional importance  (Kursk – Lgov – Rylsk – border with Ukraine) as part of the European route E38, 1.5 km from the road  (38K-017 – Lgov), 0.3 km from the nearest railway halt 584 km (Lgov II) (railway line Navlya – Lgov-Kiyevsky).

The rural locality is situated 79 km from Kursk Vostochny Airport, 146 km from Belgorod International Airport and 276 km from Voronezh Peter the Great Airport.

References

Notes

Sources

Rural localities in Lgovsky District